Tibor Montvai (born 23 November 1978 in Eger) is a Hungarian football player who currently plays for Nyíregyháza Spartacus.

References 
This article has been written based on the Hungarian version of Wikipedia *:hu:Montvai Tibor
Player profile at HLSZ 

1978 births
Living people
Sportspeople from Eger
Hungarian footballers
Association football forwards
Egri FC players
BFC Siófok players
Diósgyőri VTK players
Pécsi MFC players
Zalaegerszegi TE players
Paksi FC players
Nyíregyháza Spartacus FC players
Kecskeméti TE players